TouchMaster is a video game created by Midway Games for the Nintendo DS. It supports Nintendo Wi-Fi Connection and was released on June 25, 2007 in North America. A sequel, Touchmaster 2 (known as More Touchmaster in Europe), was released on November 3, 2008. A second sequel called TouchMaster 3 was released on October 27, 2009. The third and final sequel, Touchmaster: Connect (known as Touchmaster 4: Connect in Europe), which used to allow players to post high scores to Facebook and Twitter, was released in 2010. Touchmaster tests the player's skills on the Nintendo DS with a variety of games and challenges.

The games share the TouchMaster name with Midway's previous series of coin-operated touchscreen games.

Included games
Gem Slide, Crystal Balls, Hot Hoops, Mahki, Mah Jong Pairs, Pond Kings, Pairs, Target 21, 3 Peak Deluxe, Phoenix 13, Power Cell, Solitaire Classic, Artifact, 5 Star Generals, Double Take, Go Wild, Uplift, Times Square, Word Search, Triple Elevens, Pick Up 6, Wordz, Trivia

Reception
TouchMaster received a "Platinum" sales award from the Entertainment and Leisure Software Publishers Association (ELSPA), indicating sales of at least 300,000 copies in the United Kingdom.

References

External links
TouchMaster official website

2007 video games
Warner Bros. Games franchises
Midway video games
Nintendo DS games
Nintendo DS-only games
Puzzle video games
Video games developed in the United States
Video games scored by Alexander Brandon